Allocasuarina grevilleoides is a shrub of the genus Allocasuarina native to a small area in the western Wheatbelt  region of Western Australia.

It is found in sandy and gravelly lateritic soils.

The species was first formally described as Casuarina grevilleoides by the botanist Ludwig Diels in 1904 as part of the work Fragmenta Phytographiae Australiae occidentalis. Beitrage zur Kenntnis der Pflanzen Westaustraliens, ihrer Verbreitung und ihrer Lebensverhaltnisse. Botanische Jahrbücher für Systematik, Pflanzengeschichte und Pflanzengeographie. It was reclassified in 1982 into the genus Allocasuarina by Lawrence Alexander Sidney Johnson in the Journal of the Adelaide Botanic Gardens.

References

grevilleoides
Rosids of Western Australia
Fagales of Australia
Plants described in 1982
Dioecious plants